The Forty-fourth Oklahoma Legislature was a meeting of the legislative branch of the government of Oklahoma, composed of the Senate and the House of Representatives. State legislators met at the Oklahoma State Capitol in Oklahoma City in regular sessions from January 5 to May 28, 1993, and from February 7 to May 27, 1994, during the second two years of the term of Governor David Walters. State legislators met in special session from May 23 through 27, 1994, and for six days between October 3 and November 4, 1994.

Stratton Taylor served as President pro tempore of the Oklahoma Senate and Glen D. Johnson, Jr. served as Speaker of the Oklahoma House of Representatives.

Dates of sessions
Organizational day: January 5, 1993
First regular session: February–May 1993
Second regular session: February–May 1994
Previous: 43rd Legislature • Next: 45th Legislature

Party composition

Senate

House of Representatives

Leadership
Senate President Pro Tempore: Robert V. Cullison
Senate Majority Leader:  Darryl F. Roberts
Senate Minority Leader: Howard Hendrick
Speaker of the House: Glen D. Johnson, Jr.
Speaker Pro Tempore: Jim Glober
House Minority Leader: Larry Ferguson

Members

Senate

Districts 25, 27, 28, 36, and 53 did not exist in 1993. Table based on list of historic members.

House of Representatives

Table based on government database.

References

External links
Oklahoma Senate

Oklahoma legislative sessions
1993 in Oklahoma
1994 in Oklahoma
1993 U.S. legislative sessions
1994 U.S. legislative sessions